Wolf Parade is an EP by the Canadian indie band Wolf Parade. It was released on May 17, 2016.

Reception 

Wolf Parade received positive reviews from critics. On Metacritic, the EP holds a score of 75/100 based on 5 reviews, indicating "generally favorable reviews."

Track listing

Personnel 
 Wolf Parade - recording
 Jordan Koop - recording
 Harris Newman - mastering
 Michael McCarthy - mixing (tracks 1, 4)
 Jonas Verwijnen - mixing (tracks 2, 3)
 Luke Ramsey – artwork

References

2016 EPs
Wolf Parade albums